Sankt Georgen an der Stiefing (Central Bavarian: Sankt Georgen on da Stiefing) is a municipality in the district of Leibnitz in Styria, Austria.

References 

Cities and towns in Leibnitz District